São Facundo e Vale das Mós is a freguesia ("civil parish") in the municipality of Abrantes, Portugal. It was formed in 2013 by the merger of the former parishes São Facundo and Vale das Mós. The population in 2011 was 1,515, in an area of 104.91 km².

References

Freguesias of Abrantes